Joan Baker (born October 14, 1960) is an American voice-over and television actress. Her credits include shows such as Saturday Night Live and Guiding Light, and she has done voice-overs for the anime film MD Geist and for the Grand Theft Auto series.

Bibliography
 —Secrets of Voice-over Success. Sentient Publications

External links

1960 births
Living people
Western Kentucky University faculty
Actresses from San Francisco